Knesiyat Hasekhel (from Hebrew: "The Mind Church") is an Israeli rock band from Sderot.

History
The name of the band, established in the early 1990s, is a translation into Hebrew of Church of Reason, from Robert Pirsig's book Zen and the Art of Motorcycle Maintenance.

The music is a blend of new wave music and post-punk influences (particularly Nick Cave and the Bad Seeds) and Mediterranean and Middle Eastern ethnic rock. In 1992, Knesiyat Hasekhel produced its first studio album, "Whispered Words" (nanadisk).

The second full length and self-titled album "Knesiyat Hasekhel" was released in 1999.  The band was named "best rock group of 1999" by Israel's national radio station, and invited to play at major rock festivals around the country.

In 2001, Mashina's Shlomi Bracha helped produce the band's third album "Rutz Yeled" (Run, Kid!), a studio album that was recorded live. Following the release of the album, the band toured with Ehud Banai.

Their fourth album "Yadaiim Lemalah" (Hands Up) was released in 2004, and was produced for the first time by the band themselves.

In 2007 the band teamed up with a new label to produce "Autobiography," re-recording their hits accompanied by a 40-piece orchestra composed of ethnic and traditional classical instruments. A live show was produced for the Israel Festival.

Discography
Whispered Words (Nanadisk) – 1993
Here are Songs (Hed Artzi) – 1994 E.P.
Church of Reason (Levantini) – 1999
Run Child (NMC Records) – 2001
Hands Up (NMC Records) – 2004
Autobiography (Barbi Records) – 2007
Rows of People -  2010
Home Is So Far - 2013 
It Is Not Me - 2017

See also
Israeli music

References

External links
YouTube page

Israeli rock music groups
Sderot